MSMA may refer to:
 Magnetic shape-memory alloy, a type of shape memory material which responds to magnetic fields
 Monosodium methyl arsenate